Michael George Williams (born August 14, 1963) is an American retired basketball player. Born in Chicago, Illinois, he attended De La Salle Institute where he led the Meteors to three straight Catholic League titles and went to the state tournament's Elite Eight twice. He was a 6'8" 255 lb power forward and attended the University of Cincinnati and Bradley University. In two seasons at Bradley from 1984 to 1986, Williams averaged 13.0 points and 6.8 rebounds per game.

Williams, originally selected by the Golden State Warriors with the 4th pick in the third round of the 1986 NBA Draft, played for the NBA's Sacramento Kings and Atlanta Hawks during the 1989–1990 season, averaging 0.7 points and 1.1 rebounds per game.

On November 29, 2009, Williams was shot and paralyzed while working at an Atlanta nightclub.

References

External links
NBA stats @ basketballreference.com

1963 births
Living people
African-American basketball players
American expatriate basketball people in Spain
American shooting survivors
Atlanta Hawks players
Basketball players at the 1995 Pan American Games
Bradley Braves men's basketball players
CB Murcia players
Cincinnati Bearcats men's basketball players
Club Ourense Baloncesto players
Fort Wayne Fury players
Golden State Warriors draft picks
La Crosse Catbirds players
Liga ACB players
Pan American Games medalists in basketball
Pan American Games silver medalists for the United States
People with paraplegia
Power forwards (basketball)
Sacramento Kings players
Sioux Falls Skyforce (CBA) players
American men's basketball players
Medalists at the 1995 Pan American Games
Basketball players from Chicago
21st-century African-American people
20th-century African-American sportspeople